Alexandre D'Acol Joaquim (born 18 July 1986) is a Brazilian footballer who plays as a striker.

Career
Born in São Paulo, D'Acol began playing professional football for local side Comercial Futebol Clube (São Paulo). He had a loan spell with Esporte Clube Vitória, and would join Greek Superleague side Olympiacos in August 2004.

Career in Greece
Olympiacos send D'Acol on a one-year loan to Kerkyra in 2006 and again in 2007.
While in Kallithea D'Acol made his way to be one of the top goal-scorers in both the Greek Football League (Second Professional League) and the Greek Cup.
In 2013, AEK Athens signed D'Acol for two years. In his first appearance with AEK's jersey (friendly match, 31 August 2013), he scored a goal against his previous team, Kallithea.

Hamilton Academical
On 26 August 2015, D'Acol joined Scottish Premiership side Hamilton Academical on a one-year deal. On 27 June 2016, he signed a new contract, keeping him at the club for a further year.

Return to Greece
On 11 September 2017, just before the end of the transfer window, Lamia announced the signing of the Brazilian striker. On 19 December 2017, after some poor performances, the club announced that D'Acol's contract had been terminated. On 1 January 2018, he signed a contract with Football League club Trikala F.C.

References

External links

 
Onsports Profile
Profile at EPAE.org

1986 births
Living people
Brazilian footballers
Brazilian expatriate footballers
Association football forwards
Expatriate footballers in Greece
Olympiacos F.C. players
A.O. Kerkyra players
Panionios F.C. players
Kallithea F.C. players
Thrasyvoulos F.C. players
AEK Athens F.C. players
Hamilton Academical F.C. players
Super League Greece players
Scottish Professional Football League players
Expatriate footballers in Scotland
Footballers from São Paulo